Chris Rooney, known as Rhino, is a goofy-footed American skateboarder and skate photographer from Boston, MA. Rhino has received critical acclaim for his photography of skateboarding.

Photography career 
Rhino got his first photo in Thrasher magazine in 1999. Rhino has been a staff photographer at Thrasher magazine since 2005.

References

External links 
 Rhino interview by Jim Murphy in Juice Magazine - 2016

Skate photographers
American skateboarders
Year of birth missing (living people)
Living people